Bizaki Rural District is a rural district (dehestan) in Golbajar District, Chenaran County, Razavi Khorasan Province, Iran. At the 2006 census, its population was 11,740, in 2,840 families.  The rural district has 98 villages.

References 

Rural Districts of Razavi Khorasan Province
Chenaran County